The Parc de Milan is a public park of the city of Lausanne, Switzerland.

The Parc de Milan and the Cantonal Botanical Museum and Gardens form a vast park located between Lausanne railway station and Lake Léman.

Notes and references

External links 

 Page on the website of the City of Lausanne

Parks in Lausanne